A.K.A Nadia (Nadia - Shem Zmani) is a 2015 Israeli film, a debut directing work by Tova Ascher, a noted Israeli film editor. It is a story of a Palestinian woman Nadya, who spent most of her adult life pretending to be a Jew (Maya).

Plot summary
Nadya falls in love with a PLO activist Nimmer and they marry secretly in London. Nimmer disappears, she is left without papers and support, and takes a job in a laundry. She manages to get a fake passport with the help of a laundry "customer #347", but the passport is for an Israeli Jew.

Fast forward 15 years, Nadya, now Maya, married to a government official, has become a successful choreographer. When her company is to perform a dance in collaboration with Arabs, she meets Nimmer, who is a member of the coordinating committee...

Awards
The film was nominated for several awards and won two.
2015: Israel Critics’ Forum Award for best feature film at the Jerusalem Film Festival. Jury motivation: "...for a profound and articulate discussion of issues of identity and belonging to a place and a family. The director offers an intricate portrait of a reality that is grounded in separation walls, checkpoints and segregation. The film examines whether one can create oneself anew within a tragic political context, by presenting a fascinating, complex and touching human story."
2017: Micki Moore Award (to the Best Narrative Feature Film directed by a woman) at the Toronto Jewish Film Festival

See also
Twist of Fate

References

External links

טובה אשר - במאית מלידה, an interview with detailed discussion of the creation of the film and film itself

Israeli drama films
Israeli–Palestinian conflict films
2015 films
2015 drama films
Films about identity theft